The 2020–21 Liga EBA season was the 27th season of the Spanish basketball fourth league. It started on 17 October 2020 with the first round of the regular season and ended on 16 May 2021 with the promotion playoffs.

It was the following season after the 2019–20 season was curtailed in response to the COVID-19 pandemic. Consequently, the competition systems were adapted to the growth of the number of teams with a series of independent modifications in each of the five conferences.

Conference A
The Conference A consisted of 3 groups of 11 teams from Galicia, Asturias, Cantabria, Castile and León, Navarre, La Rioja and Basque Country.

Teams

Regular season

Group A–A

Group A–B

Group A–C

Conference B
The Conference B consisted of 17 teams in 2 groups from Canary Islands, Castilla–La Mancha and Community of Madrid.

Teams

First phase

Group B–A

Group B–B

Second phase

Group B–Promotion–1

Group B–Promotion–2

Group B–Promotion–3

Group B–Relegation

Conference C
The Conference C consisted of 5 groups of 7 teams from Aragon, Catalonia and Balearic Islands.

Teams

Regular season

Group C–1

Group C–2

Group C–3

Group C–4

Group C–5

Qualification playoffs

|}

Conference D
The Conference D consisted of 2 groups of 11 teams from Andalusia, Extremadura, Ceuta and Melilla.

Teams

Regular season

Group D–A

Group D–B

Qualification playoffs

|}

Conference E
The Conference E consisted of 2 groups of 10 teams from Valencian Community and Murcia.

Teams

First phase

Group E–A

Group E–B

Second phase

Promotion group

Relegation group

Promotion playoffs
The two best teams of each conference; the third of Conferences A, B, C and E; and the fourth of Conferences B and C played the promotion playoffs. From these 16 teams, only five were promoted to LEB Plata. Each promotion playoff consisted in two groups of four teams where the subgroup winners promoted directly to LEB Plata. The two runners-up from each subgroup played a final match for the last spot.

Group A – Salou

Subgroup A1

Subgroup A2

Repechage

Group B – Valencia

Subgroup B3

Subgroup B4

Repechage

Final standings

References

External links
Liga EBA at FEB.es 

Liga EBA seasons
EBA